The men's team portion of  Table tennis at the 2013 Summer Universiade was held between July 7–12.

Results

References
Bracket

2013 Summer Universiade events